The 2008 NCAA Women's Division I Swimming and Diving Championships were contested at the 27th annual NCAA-sanctioned swim meet to determine the team and individual national champions of Division I women's collegiate swimming and diving in the United States. 

This year's events were hosted by the Ohio State University at the McCorkle Aquatic Pavilion in Columbus, Ohio. 

Arizona topped the team standings for the first time, finishing 136 points (484–348) ahead of two-time defending champions Auburn. This was the Wildcats' first women's team title. Arizona also captured the 2008 men's title.

Team standings
Note: Top 10 only
(H) = Hosts
(DC) = Defending champions
Full results

See also
List of college swimming and diving teams

References

NCAA Division I Swimming And Diving Championships
NCAA Division I Swimming And Diving Championships
NCAA Division I Women's Swimming and Diving Championships